Kawkab al-Hawa, is a depopulated former Palestinian village located 11 km north of Baysan. It was built within the ruins of the Crusader fortress of Belvoir, from which it expanded. The Crusader names for the Frankish settlement at Kawkab al-Hawa were Beauvoir, Belvoir, Bellum videre, Coquet, Cuschet and Coket. During Operation Gideon in 1948, the village was occupied by the Golani Brigade and depopulated.

History
Yaqut al-Hamawi, writing in the 1220s, referred to the place as a castle near Tiberias. According to him, it fell in ruins after the reign of Saladin. The Ayyubid commander of Ajlun, Izz al-Din Usama, was given Kawkab al-Hawa as an iqta ("fief") by Saladin in the late 1180s and it remained in his hands until 1212, when it was seized by sultan al-Mu'azzam.

An inscription in the Ustinow collection, dated, tentatively, to the 13th century,  Ayyubid period, was found incised on a basalt rock near the spring at Kawkab al-Hawa. The inscription state: "He ordered to make this blessed fountain the illustrious amir, Shuja ad-Din, may his glory be perpetuated."

Ottoman era
Under the Ottoman Empire, in 1596, Kawkab al-Hawa was administrated by nahiya ("subdistrict") of Shafa under the liwa' ("district") of Lajjun. It had a population of 9 Muslim households, an estimated 50 persons. The villagers   paid taxes on a number of crops, including wheat, beans and melons, as well as on vineyards; a total of 4,500  akçe.

Pierre Jacotin named  the village Kaoukab on his map from 1799. The scholar Edward Robinson described the place in 1838 as a small village ("Kaukab el-Hawa"), situated "on the brow of the Jordan Valley", and he identified the place as the former Belvoir fortress.

Victor Guérin visited in 1875, and found some families using the vaulted spaces still standing inside the fortress.

Since the village was built within the outlines of the fortress of Belvoir, it was slow to expand. The villagers, who numbered about 110 in 1859, resided within the fortress walls and cultivated about 13 faddans  outside them.

British Mandate era
In  the 1922 census of Palestine, conducted by the  Mandatory Palestine authorities,  Kukab had a population of 167, all Muslims, increasing in the  1931 census   to 220, still all  Muslims, in 46  houses.

In time the village expanded to the north and the west in a circle around the fortress. The Muslim population of the village used their land, which lay outside the village walls, for agriculture. 

In  the 1945 statistics Kawkab al-Hawa had a population of 300 Muslims with a total of 9,949 dunes of land. Of this, a total of 5,839 dunums was allocated to cereals; 170 dunums were irrigated or used for orchards,  while 56 dunams was built-up land.

1948 War and aftermath
According to Benny Morris, Kibbutzniks demanded - and often themselves carried out - the destruction of neighbouring villages as a means of blocking the return of the Arab villagers. For this reason a veteran local leader, Nahum Hurwitz of Kfar Gil'adi appealed in a letter  in September 1948  for permission to destroy Kawkab al-Hawa, Jabbul, al-Bira and al-Hamidiyya in the area for fear that they may be used by Arabs for military operations and to enable them to "take the village's lands, because the Arabs won't be able to return there".

Walid Khalidi described the remaining structures of the village in 1992:

"The village has been eliminated, but the site of the Belvoir Castle has been excavated and turned into a tourist attraction. Fig and olive trees grow on the village site. The slopes overlooking the Baysan Valley and Wadi al-Bira are used by Israelis as grazing areas; they also cultivate the other surrounding lands."

According to Meron Benvenisti, Kawkab al-Hawa represents one of the most conspicuous examples of the Israeli practice of removing Arab settlements of all Arab structures which did not interest them. At Kawkab al-Hawa (and at Caesarea) all Arab structures (except those useful as tourist amenities) were demolished by the Israelis, while the Crusader buildings were restored and made into tourist attractions. According to Benvenisti: "In the Israeli context, it is preferable to immortalize those who exterminated the Jewish communities of Europe (in the late eleventh and early twelfth centuries) and murdered the Jews of Jerusalem in 1099 than to preserve relics of the local Arab civilization with which today's Israelis coexist. Crusader structures, both authentic and fabricated, lend a European, romantic character to the country's landscape, whereas Arab buildings spoil the myth of an occupied land under foreign rule, awaiting liberation at the hands of the Jews returning to their homeland."

See also
Depopulated Palestinian locations in Israel

References

Bibliography

  (Conder, 1874, pp. 179-180)
 
  
  
 

 
 
 

  

 
 (Robinson and Smith, 1841, vol 3, pp. 177, 219)
 (pp. 310, 314, 329, 339)

External links
Welcome to Kawkab-al-Hawa
Kawkab al-Hawa,  Zochrot
Survey of Western Palestine, Map 9:     IAA, Wikimedia commons 
Kawkab al-Hawa, at Khalil Sakakini Cultural Center
Kawkab Al-Hawa photos from Dr. Moslih Kanaaneh

Arab villages depopulated during the 1948 Arab–Israeli War
District of Baysan